Art of Jiu-Jitsu (AOJ) is a Brazilian jiu-jitsu academy and team started in 2012 by black belt world champions, brothers Rafael and Guilherme Mendes together with RVCA founder PM Tenore. The academy is known for developing young grapplers into some of the best competitors in the world.

History 
The Art Of Jiu-Jitsu (AOJ) academy was established in 2012 by Rafael and Guilherme Mendes, in collaboration with RVCA founder PM Tenore, as an affiliate of Atos Jiu-Jitsu. The academy is located in Costa Mesa, California.

In 2015, the Mendes brothers started the Believe & Achieve Grappling Scholarship, a training scholarship to provide select juvenile athletes full room and board, assistance with event registration and travel, and the opportunity to train with one of the world's top competitive teams. The first two athletes to be recruited were Caio Antonini from Minas Gerais and Johnatha Alves from São Paulo, chosen out of 1,000 applicants. Recipients of the scholarship later included Tainan Dalpra.

In 2015 and 2016 the Mendes brothers retired from their competitive careers, after winning 10 world titles between them, to focus on their academy.

The academy became known for its strong children's program, among their first students were twin brothers Tye and Kade Ruotolo who trained at AOJ between the age of 10 and 14, before transferring to Atos’ adult program in 2017.

During the 2020 IBJJF European Championship taking place in January, AOJ athletes started competing under "Art of Jiu Jitsu", instead of Atos; the following month, AOJ officially split from Atos becoming its own affiliation. The same year, the brothers promoted the first black belts from the kid's program, Jessa Khan and Tainan Dalpra who started at AOJ through the Believe & Achieve program.

As a black belt, Dalpra won the 2021 IBJJF World Championship. The following year, Dalpra and Thalison Soares won the 2022 World Championship representing AOJ. The AOJ men's team came fourth at the 2022 World Jiu-Jitsu Championship despite competing as a single school.

Notable members
A list of current and former members:
 Cole Abate
 Johnatha Alves
 Lucas Carvalho
 Margot Ciccarelli
 Tainan Dalpra
 Sophia Dalpra
 Pablo Lavaselli
 Jessa Khan
 Jhonathan Marques
 Mikey Musumeci
 Tammi Musumeci
 Diego "Pato" Oliveira
 Mateus Rodrigues
 Tye Ruotolo
 Kade Ruotolo
 Thalison Soares

References

External links 
 Secret Sauce: Art Of Jiu-Jitsu's Three Pillars of Success

Brazilian jiu-jitsu organizations
2012 establishments